Antonei Benjamin Csoka, Ph.D. is a biogerontologist at Howard University who works on the molecular biology of aging, regenerative medicine, and epigenetics.

Education
Dr. Csoka earned a bachelor's degrees at Newcastle University in Genetics. He has a master's in Molecular Pathology from University of Leicester and a PhD in Cellular and Molecular Biology from University of Debrecen.

Research career
He was a member of the consortium that identified the Lamin A gene as the cause of the accelerated aging disease Hutchinson–Gilford progeria syndrome and participated in the first National Institutes of Health – Progeria Research Foundation workshop. He also showed that progeria is a true representation of aging with respect to cellular signaling pathways, and truly recapitulates the normal aging process at the cellular level. He currently researches the molecular etiology of aging at the level of signaling pathways.

Publications
Csoka has authored and co-authored over 40 scientific papers.

Life extension activities
Dr. Csoka is a prominent proponent of life extension, cryonics, and transhumanism, and has been identified as one of the top twenty-three socially connected professors on Twitter. He is a scientific advisor to the Alcor Life Extension Foundation, the UK Cryonics and Cryopreservation Research Network, and the Lifeboat Foundation, a fellow of the Global Healthspan Policy Institute, and was featured in the first Immortality Institute film, Exploring Life Extension (2005) produced by Bruce Klein.

See also
 Biogerontology
 Cryonics
 Human enhancement
 Transhumanism
 Senescence

References

Biogerontologists
Life extensionists
Alumni of the University of Leicester
Living people
American transhumanists
Year of birth missing (living people)